The Big Three is the nickname of the three most successful and biggest football clubs in Portugal. The teams of S.L. Benfica and Sporting CP, both from Lisbon, and of FC Porto, from Porto, have a great rivalry and are usually the main contenders for the Primeira Liga title. They share all but two of the Portuguese Football Championships ever played, and generally end up sharing the top three positions. None of them have been relegated from the Primeira Liga either, having been participants in all editions since its first season in 1934–35. Benfica's lowest position was 6th in 2000–01, while Porto's 9th place finish in 1969–70 makes the closest any side has come to relegation. Sporting's worst finish was a 7th place finish in 2012–13.

Benfica and Porto are the only Portuguese teams to have won the European Cup/UEFA Champions League, which they have both won on two occasions. The closest Sporting came was in 1983, when they reached the quarter-finals.

The only two clubs outside the Big Three to have won the Portuguese league are Belenenses, in the 1945–46 season, and Boavista, in the 2000–01 campaign. Belenenses has been relegated four times to the second tier, while Boavista has been in the third tier twice.

The three-way rivalry
Benfica vs. Sporting:

Benfica vs. Porto:

Porto vs. Sporting:

Statistics

League placements

Honours comparison

Footballers who have played for the three clubs
Eight footballers have played for Benfica, Porto, and Sporting. Of those, only Eurico Gomes won the domestic league for all three (twice with each club). Additionally, Eurico is also the only player to enter the following list without having played for another club in-between his Big Three career.

  Carlos Alhinho: Sporting 1972–75; Porto 1976; Benfica 1976–77, 1978–81
  Eurico Gomes: Benfica 1975–79; Sporting 1979–82; Porto 1982–87
  Romeu Silva: Benfica 1975–77; Porto 1979–83; Sporting 1983–86
  Paulo Futre: Sporting 1983–84; Porto 1984–87; Benfica 1993
  Fernando Mendes: Sporting 1985–89; Benfica 1989–91, 1992–93; Porto 1996–99
  Emílio Peixe: Sporting 1991–95, 1996–97; Porto 1997–2002; Benfica 2002–03
  Derlei: Porto 2002–05; Benfica 2007 (loan); Sporting 2007–09
  Maniche: Benfica 1995–96, 1999–2002; Porto 2002–05; Sporting 2010–11
  Miguel Lopes: Benfica 2005–06; Porto 2009–10, 2012–13; Sporting 2013, 2014–15

Managers who managed all three clubs
  Otto Glória: Benfica 1954–59, 1968–70; Sporting 1961, 1965–66; Porto 1964–65
  Fernando Riera: Benfica 1962–63, 1966–68; Porto 1972–73; Sporting 1974–75
  Fernando Santos: Porto 1998–2001; Sporting 2003–04; Benfica 2006–07
  Jesualdo Ferreira: Benfica 2001–03; Porto 2006–10, Sporting 2013

See also
 Big Three (Belgium)
 Big Three (Costa Rica)
 Big Three (Greece)
 Big Three (Netherlands)
 Big Three (Peru)
 Big Three (Turkey)
 Big Twelve (Brazilian football)
 List of association football club rivalries in Europe

References

Football rivalries in Portugal
S.L. Benfica
FC Porto
Sporting CP